The Web Authentication Working Group, created by the World Wide Web Consortium (W3C) on February 17, 2016, has for mission, in the Security Activity, to define a client-side API providing strong authentication functionality to Web Applications.

On 20 March 2018, the WebAuthn standard was published as a W3C Candidate Recommendation.

References 

World Wide Web Consortium